Zoogoneticus tequila, Tequila splitfin or simply Tequila fish, is a species of goodeid fish (family Goodeidae) from Mexico. The specific epithet, tequila, derives from the Tequila Volcano, which looms near the type locality.

Distribution and conservation
Zoogoneticus tequila is endemic to the Ameca River basin in west-central Mexico. Its current distribution is restricted to a single spring pool in Teuchitlán, only  in diameter, where a population consisting of less than 50 adult fish live. Even in this habitat, it is outnumbered by introduced guppies by a factor of six. Before the discovery of the pool population in 2000/2001, Zoogoneticus tequila was generally thought to inhabit rivers; however, no fish could be found in the original habitat and the species was considered extinct in the wild. Introduced fish species have been implicated in the disappearance of Zoogoneticus tequila from its type locality. Habitat deterioration may also have contributed. Pollution and water extraction are threats to the pool where the wild population persists. Captive populations are maintained by aquarists.

Description
Along with other Mexican goodeids, Zoogoneticus tequila are viviparous; this led the genus to be originally included in family Poeciliidae. Clutch size is up to 29 young. Total length can reach  in females. The sexes can also be distinguished by colouration. Adult males have cream-colored terminal bands on the anal and dorsal fin. The caudal fin of adult males has crescent-shaped band of red-orange, orange, or yellow. The rest of the caudal fin is not pigmented and is transparent. Some large adult females share this caudal coloration but generally their caudal fins are transparent. Both sexes display olive shaded, mottled bodies with males typically darker than the families. Juveniles are lighter colored with more obvious mottling.

Diet 
These fish typically eat various types of zooplankton and insect larvae in the water such as those of chironomids. There have also been recorded instances of cannibalism of the immature young.

Predation 
Typical predators endemic in the geographic range are Esox sp. and Thamnophis sp. There are also many introduced species in the area that likely prey on or outcompeted Z. tequila such as Xiphophorus maculatus, Tilapia aurea, Lepomis macrochirus, Cyprinus carpio, X. helleri and Poecilia reticulata.

Conservation Status 
After a few successful reintroductions of Z. tequila in the wild became established, the International Union for Conservation of Nature gave the species the status of endangered. However, it is still considered by many to be extinct in the wild. DNA analysis of natural populations of Z. tequila have shown that because the populations are extremely small there is a large amount of inbreeding which could be contributing to the precipitous decline in populations in the wild.

References

External links
 The Goodeid Working Group: Zoogoneticus tequila
 Biodiversity: The tale of the 'un-extinct' fish – BBC

Goodeinae
Endemic fish of Mexico
Freshwater fish of Mexico
Natural history of Jalisco
Endangered biota of Mexico
Endangered fauna of North America
Taxa named by Robert Rush Miller
Fish described in 1998